SFK may refer to:

 Sound Forge peak audio file extension
 Something for Kate, Australian rock band
 Siófok-Kiliti Airport, Hungary (IATA code)
 Suffolk, county in England, Chapman code
 SFK Lyn, Norwegian sports club
 SFK 2000, women's football club from Sarajevo, Bosnia and Herzegovina
 SFK Varavīksne, Latvian football club
 ŠFK Prenaks Jablonec, Slovak football team,
 SFK Nová Ves nad Váhom, Slovak football team